The 1990 Giro del Trentino was the 14th edition of the Tour of the Alps cycle race and was held on 7 May to 10 May 1990. The race started in Arco and finished in Trento. The race was won by Gianni Bugno.

General classification

References

1990
1990 in road cycling
1990 in Italian sport